Pigman or pig man may refer to:

People
Cary Pigman (born 1958), Florida politician
William Ward Pigman (1910-1977), carbohydrate chemist
Peter-Paul Pigmans (1961–2003), a Dutch gabber music producer best known for his production under the pseudonym 3 Steps Ahead

Creative works
The Pigman, a book by Paul Zindel
Pigman (film), a 2012 Indian Malayalam film
"PigMan", a song by Mondo Generator on their album Cocaine Rodeo
"The Pig Man", a song by Amon Düül II on their album Vive la Trance
Pigman, a character played by Jody Racicot in the film PCU
Pigman: A Comedy in Three Acts, a play by Robert Chesley
Pig man, a fictional hospital patient that Seinfeld character Cosmo Kramer saw in the episode "The Bris"

See also
Piglady